Steve West (born May 30, 1964) is a drummer and main lyricist of the band Danger Danger. He has played on all of Danger Danger's albums to date.

Before Danger Danger, he was in the band Hotshot with original Danger Danger lead vocalist Mike Pont and Danger Danger bassist Bruno Ravel.

He also guested as a backing vocalist on Warrant's Cherry Pie album.

Discography

With Danger Danger
 all albums to date

Guest appearances
 Warrant - Cherry Pie (backing vocals)

With The Defiants
 Self titled (2016) 
 Zokusho (2019)

References

External links

Danger Danger members
American heavy metal drummers
Living people
1964 births
20th-century American drummers
American male drummers